Rakuten.co.uk is a website owned by Rakuten, that operates as an online marketplace. The website does not sell any products directly, but instead allows third party sellers to sell their products. The website replaced Play.com, which was originally established in Jersey as an online retailer of entertainment products including DVDs and music, which subsequently expanded its product offering.

Rakuten purchased Play.com in 2011, and in 2013 the company switched to its new marketplace format following a change in the law covering VAT for companies operating in Jersey and selling to consumers on the UK mainland.

The Play.com website was replaced by Rakuten.co.uk on 23 March 2015.

History

Play.com

The business was founded in 1998 under the name Play247.com, but rebranded as Play.com in 2000. Play.com originally sold region 1 and 2 DVDs only, but since expanded its range to include CDs and video games and other electronic items. In 2004 it began to sell books and electronics, in 2006 it started selling personal computers, posters and T-shirts and in 2007 it started selling HD DVDs and Blu-rays, with sister site PlayUSA.com selling region 1 DVDs, HD DVDs and region A Blu-ray Discs and offering sales in a range of currencies. The site's interface was redesigned on a number of occasions.

Play.com was ranked second on the November 2006 UK "Hot Shops List" compiled by IMRG and Hitwise.

In 2008, Play.com started selling DRM-free MP3s, clothing, accessories, and tickets for events, allowing customers to buy and sell tickets. They also held a consumer games show which was open to the public, with tickets available through Play.com. This event was backed by Sony, Microsoft, Ubisoft, Activision, and THQ among others.

On 15 January 2009, a survey published by Verdict Research found Play.com was the UK's second favourite music and video retailer, behind first place Amazon.co.uk and ahead of the now defunct entertainment retailer Zavvi which was third. On 24 February 2009, it was reported that Play.com had topped the National Consumer Satisfaction Index, ahead of Amazon.co.uk and iTunes.

In May 2009, Play.com launched a branded Visa credit card in partnership with MBNA. Cardholders received points for purchases made on the website and at other retailers. Points could then be redeemed against products bought on the Play.com website.

The PlayUSA.com website was closed down in February 2011. In September 2011, Japan-based Rakuten purchased Play.com for £25 million.

Since March 2013, Play.com has operated solely as an online marketplace, where third party retailers sell products with their listings hosted on the website. All retailers on the Marketplace have the ability to build a fully branded and customised storefront, giving them control of how their products are merchandised.

Replacement with Rakuten
In October 2014 Rakuten launched Rakuten.co.uk, which replaced Play.com completely on 23 March 2015.

Rakuten UK to close

On 7 June 2016 Rakuten announced plans for changes in the business in the UK. Rakuten.co.uk in its existing format would no longer be available after the end of August 2016 for new purchases. Rakuten.co.uk was then relaunched in October 2016 as a portal to earn "Superpoints" from using online shops such as Topman, HMV and B&Q.

References

External links

Archived version of play247.com, circa 2000

Online retailers of the United Kingdom
Retail companies established in 1998
Internet properties established in 1998
British subsidiaries of foreign companies
Companies of Jersey
Rakuten
1998 establishments in Jersey